Khaali Peeli is a 2020 Indian Hindi-language masala film starring Ishaan Khatter, Ananya Panday and Jaideep Ahlawat. Khaali Peeli is directed by Maqbool Khan and produced by Ali Abbas Zafar, Zee Studios and Offside Entertainment. The story was written by Yash Keswani and Sima Agarwal.

Principal photography begun on 11 September 2019 and shoot wrapped up in March 2020. The film's initial release on 12 June 2020 was deferred due to COVID-19 pandemic. Khaali Peeli is released digitally on Zee Plex with pay-per-view model on 2 October 2020.

It is about a couple who go to find a key which costs 7,00,00,000.On reaching there they come to know about Don Babban who is a criminal who is actually the couple's landlord.

Cast 
 Ishaan Khatter as Vijay "Blackie" Chauhan
 Rajesh Desaai as Young Vijay a.k.a. Blackie
 Ananya Panday as Pooja Gaur
 Deshna Duggad as Young Pooja 
 Jaideep Ahlawat as Yusuf Chikna
Zakir Hussain as Inspector Tawde
 Satish Kaushik as Inspector Bhim Singh
 Swanand Kirkire as Choksi Seth
 Suyash Tilak as Mangesh
 Anup Soni as Ravi / Babuji
 Kabir Duhan Singh as Goon
 Bhushan Vikas as Mahesh 
 Vinod Nahardih as Mannu
 Purnanand Wandekar as Jaidev
 Vaishali Thakkar as Khala

Soundtrack 

The film's music was composed by Vishal–Shekhar, while lyrics were written by Kumaar and Raj Shekhar.

The song "Beyonce Sharma Jaayegi" was criticised online for lyrics that some found racist. The song has been contrasted with Beyoncé's "Brown Skin Girl", as Rolling Stone India pointed out how on one hand, Beyoncé is working towards the racial empowerment through her song, but the Bollywood song, names her, and says she will be "embarrassed of fairskined Ananya Panday's dancing skills". HuffPost India wrote "What's a bit of racism sprinkled over the regular dose of sexism". News18 India said "It seems despite the Black Lives Matter movement, the hashtags and the social media outrage, Bollywood hasn't learned much about racism". After receiving heavy backlash online, the director Maqbool Khan apologised. On 13 September, the producers changed the spelling of the title, from "Beyoncé" to "Beyonse". News18 India reported that Jay-Z trademarked and protected the name "Beyoncé" and it therefore cannot be used without their permission. The title was subsequently changed again, to "Duniya Sharma Jayegi". However, despite the name change, the video received 1 million dislikes within its first week on YouTube.

Release 
Khaali Peeli was originally scheduled to be released worldwide on 11 June 2020 in cinemas, before the COVID-19 pandemic led to its postponement owing to cinemas shutdown. In August 2020, the makers sold its rights to new PVOD platform Zee Plex. Khaali Peeli was released there on 2 October 2020, coinciding with Gandhi Jayanti. It was simultaneously released in drive-in theatres of Gurugram and Bengaluru.

Reception 
The film released on the Zee Plex platform alongside Ka Pae Ranasingam. Devansh Sharma from Firstpost wrote, "After Beyond The Clouds and Dhadak, Khatter puts on display yet another side of his multifaceted personality. Khaali Peeli is his most 'commercial' film yet, a la Ranveer Singh in Rohit Shetty's Simmba. But rather than mimicking his idols, Khatter invents his style in conformity with a Mumbai taxi driver on a steady diet of Bollywood films for years — and makes a meal of it. Soumya Srivastava from Hindustan Times stated "Khaali Peeli is a concoction that can only be brewed in the belly of Bollywood. With one chase sequence following on the tails of another, director Maqbool Khan ensures not a single moment is without its adrenaline dialled up to an 11. But it’s quite shocking how easily one can grow bored of craziness as well" 

Shubra Gupta from The Indian Express said, " Khaali Peeli knows that it needs to refresh the tropes it is up against, and manages to do so only some of the time in its two-hour duration"   Uma Ramasubramanian from Mid-Day wrote "Khaali Peeli is the perfect package for Khatter, who gets to showcase his dancing skills, action, drama, romance, comedy and biceps. Known for his love for offbeat films — Majid Majidi's Beyond the Clouds (2017) and forthcoming A Suitable Boy (2020) — the wonder boy is equally crackling in a typical Bollywood entertainer. Panday, though she carries the role efficiently, doesn't deliver authenticity to the character"

References

External links
 
 
 Khaali Peeli on ZEE5

2020s Hindi-language films
Indian romantic action films
Films postponed due to the COVID-19 pandemic
Film productions suspended due to the COVID-19 pandemic
Films not released in theaters due to the COVID-19 pandemic
Indian direct-to-video films
2020s masala films